Maricopodynerus is a Nearctic genus of potter wasps distributed west of the 100° western meridian in the United States and Mexico. The second metasomal segment, with its tergum much larger than its sternum is an outstanding characteristic of this genus.

References

 Bohart, R.M. 1989. Review of Maricopodynerus (Hymenoptera: Eumenidae). Proceedings of the Entomological Society of Washington 91 : 575 - 582.

External links
 Photograph at Buggguide

Potter wasps
Hymenoptera genera